This is an incomplete list of South Korean television dramas, broadcast on nationwide networks KBS (KBS1 and KBS2), MBC, SBS; and cable channels JTBC, tvN, OCN, Channel A, MBN, Mnet and TV Chosun. The list also contains notable miniseries and web series broadcast on Naver TV, Netflix, Viu, iQIYI, TVING, Disney+, Apple TV+ and other online streaming platforms.

0-9

 100 Days My Prince (2018)
 12 Signs of Love (2012)
 12 Years Promise (2014)
 18 Again (2020)
 365: Repeat the Year (2020)
 4 Legendary Witches (2014–15)
 49 Days (2011)
 5th Republic (2005)
 7 Escape (2023)
 7 First Kisses (2016–17)
 7th Grade Civil Servant (2013)
 90 Days, Time to Love (2006–07)

A

 A Beautiful Mind (2016)
 A Bird That Doesn't Sing (2015)
 A Daughter Just Like You (2015)
 A Gentleman's Dignity (2012)
 A Girl Who Sees Smells (2015)
 A Good Day to Be a Dog (2023)
 A Happy  Woman (2007)
 A Hundred Year Legacy (2013)
 A Korean Odyssey (2017–18)
 A Little Love Never Hurts (2013–14)
 A Love So Beautiful (2020–21)
 A Love to Kill (2005)
 A Man Called God (2010)
 A Model Family (2022)
 A New Leaf (2014)
 A Piece of Your Mind (2020)
 A Place in the Sun (2019)
 A Pledge to God (2018–19)
 A Poem a Day (2018)
 A Superior Day (2022)
 A Tale of Two Sisters (2013)
 A Thousand Days' Promise (2011)
 A Thousand Kisses (2011–12)
 A Time Called You (2023)
 A Witch's Love (2014)
 A-Teen (2018)
 A-Teen 2 (2019)
 About Time (2018)
 Abyss (2019)
 Ad Genius Lee Tae-baek (2013)
 Adamas (2022)
 Adult Trainee (2021)
 Aeja's Older Sister, Minja (2008)
 Aftermath (2014)
 Again My Life (2022)
 Age of Innocence (2002)
 Age of Warriors (2003–04)
 Agency (2023)
 Air City (2007)
 Alchemy of Souls (2022)
 Alice (2020)
 All About Eve (2000)
 All About My Mom (2015–16)
 All About My Romance (2013)
 All In (2003)
 All My Love For You (2010–11)
 All of Us Are Dead (2022)
 Alone in Love (2006)
 Amanza (2020)
 Amor Fati (2021)
 Andante (2017–18)
 Ang Shim Jung (2010–11)
 Angel Eyes (2014)
 Angel's Choice (2012)
 Angel's Last Mission: Love (2019)
 Angel's Revenge (2014)
 Angry Mom (2015)
 Anna (2022)
 Another Miss Oh (2016)
 Another Peaceful Day of Second-Hand Items (2020)
 Apgujeong Midnight Sun (2014–15)
 April Kiss (2004)
 Arang and the Magistrate (2012)
 Are You Human? (2018)
 Argon (2017)
 Arthdal Chronicles (2019)
 Artificial City (2021)
 Ask the Stars (2023)
 Asphalt Man (1995)
 Assembly (2015)
 Assorted Gems (2009–10)
 At Eighteen (2019)
 At a Distance, Spring Is Green (2021)
 Athena: Goddess of War (2010–11)
 Autumn Shower (2005)
 Avengers Social Club (2017)
 Awaken (2020–21)

B

 Babel (2019)
 Baby Faced Beauty (2011)
 Babysitter (2016)
 Bachelor's Vegetable Store (2011–12)
 Backstreet Rookie (2020)
 Bad and Crazy (2021)
 Bad Family (2006)
 Bad Guy (2010)
 Bad Guys (2014)
 Bad Guys 2 (2017–18)
 Bad Housewife (2005)
 Bad Papa (2018)
 Bad Prosecutor (2022)
 Bad Thief, Good Thief (2017)
 Bad Woman, Good Woman (2007)
 Ballad of Seodong (2005–06)
 Band of Sisters (2017)
 Banjun Drama (2004–06)
 Basketball (2013)
 Be Melodramatic (2019)
 Be My Dream Family (2021)
 Be Positive (2016)
 Be Strong, Geum-soon! (2005)
 Beating Again (2015)
 Beating Heart (2005)
 Beautiful Days (2001)
 Beautiful Gong Shim (2016)
 Beautiful Love, Wonderful Life (2019–20)
 Beautiful World (2019)
 Because This Is My First Life (2017)
 Because This Is My First Twenty (2018)
 Becky's Back (2016)
 Becoming a Billionaire (2010)
 Becoming Witch (2022)
 Beethoven Virus (2008)
 Behind Every Star (2022)
 Behind the White Tower (2007)
 Bel Ami (2013–14)
 Best Chicken (2019)
 Beyond Evil (2021)
 Beyond the Clouds (2014)
 Big (2012)
 Big Bet (2022)
 Big Issue (2019)
 Big Man (2014)
 Big Mouth (2022)
 Big Thing (2010)
 Billie Jean, Look at Me (2006–07)
 Birdie Buddy (2011)
 Birth of a Beauty (2014–15)
 Birthcare Center (2020)
 Birthday Letter (2019)
 Bitter Sweet Life (2008)
 Bizarre Bunch (2005–06)
 Black (2017)
 Black Dog: Being A Teacher (2020)
 Black Knight (2023)
 Black Knight: The Man Who Guards Me (2017–18)
 Blade Man (2014)
 Blessing of the Sea (2019)
 Blind (2022)
 Blood (2015)
 Blooded Palace: The War of Flowers (2013)
 Bloody Heart (2022)
 Bloody Romance (2022)
 Blossom Sisters (2010)
 Blow Breeze (2016–17)
 Blue Birthday (2021)
 Bodyguard (2003)
 Bo-ra! Deborah (2023)
 Born Again (2020)
 Bossam: Steal the Fate (2021)
 Boys Over Flowers (2009)
 Brain (2011–12)
 Brain Works (2023)
 Bravo My Life (2017–18)
 Bravo, My Life (2022)
 Bravo, My Love! (2011–12)
 Bread, Love and Dreams (2010)
 Bridal Mask (2012)
 Bride of the Century (2014)
 Bride of the Sun (2011–12)
 Brilliant Heritage (2020)
 Brilliant Legacy (2009)
 Bring It On, Ghost (2016)
 Bubble Gum (2015)
 Bubbly Lovely (2016–17)
 Bulgasal: Immortal Souls (2021–22)
 Business Proposal (2022)

C

 Cain and Abel (2009)
 Café Minamdang (2022)
 Can We Be Strangers? (2023)
 Can We Fall in Love, Again? (2014)
 Can We Get Married? (2012–13)
 Can't Lose (2011)
 Can't Stand Anymore (2013–14)
 Capital Scandal (2007)
 Catch the Ghost (2019)
 Cats on the Roof (2003)
 Celebrity (2023)
 Cheat on Me If You Can (2020–21)
 Cheer Up (2022)
 Cheer Up! (2015)
 Cheer Up, Mr. Kim! (2012–13)
 Cheese in the Trap (2016)
 Cheongdam-dong Alice (2012–13)
 Cheongdam-dong Scandal (2014–15)
 Cheo Yong (2014)
 Chicago Typewriter (2017)
 Chicken Nugget (2023)
 Chief of Staff (2019)
 Children of a Lesser God (2018)
 Children of Nobody (2018–19)
 Children of the 20th Century (2017)
 Chimera (2021)
 Chip In (2020)
 Choco Bank (2016)
 Chocolate (2019–20)
 Chunja's Special Day (2008)
 Cinderella Man (2009)
 Cinderella with Four Knights (2016)
 Cinderella's Stepsister (2010)
 Circle (2017)
 City Conquest (cancelled)
 City Hunter (2011)
 City of the Sun (2015)
 Class of Lies (2019)
 Clean with Passion for Now (2018–19)
 Cleaning Up (2022)
 Cloud Stairs (2006)
 Coffee House (2010)
 Coffee Prince (2007)
 Coffee, Do Me a Favor (2018)
 Color Rush (2020–21)
 Coma (2006)
 Come and Hug Me (2018)
 Come Back Mister (2016)
 Confession (2019)
 Connect (2023)
 Conspiracy in the Court (2007)
 Cool Guys, Hot Ramen (2011)
 Couple or Trouble (2006)
 Crash Course in Romance (2023)
 Crash Landing on You (2019–20)
 Crazy Love (2013)
 Crazy Love (2022)
 Creating Destiny (2009–10)
 Criminal Minds (2017)
 Cross (2018)
 Cruel Love (2007–08)
 Cunning Single Lady (2014)
 Curtain Call (2022)

D

 D-Day (2015)
 D.P. (2021)
 Dae Jang Geum (2003–04)
 Dae Jang Geum Is Watching (2018–19)
 Dae Jo-yeong (2006–07)
 Daemyeong (1981)
 Daily Dose of Sunshine (2023)
 Dal-ja's Spring (2007)
 Dali & Cocky Prince (2021)
 Damo (2003)
 Dangerous Woman (2011–12)
 Daring Women (2010)
 Dark Hole (2021)
 Dating Agency: Cyrano (2013)
 Daughters-in-Law (2007–08)
 Dear Archimedes (2019)
 Dear Heaven (2005–06)
 Dear My Friends (2016)
 Dear X Who Doesn't Love Me (2022)
 Dear. M (2022)
 Deep Rooted Tree (2011)
 Definitely Neighbors (2010)
 Delayed Justice (2020–21)
 Delicious Proposal (2001)
 Delivery (2021)
 Descendants of the Sun (2016)
 Designated Survivor: 60 Days (2019)
 Detectives in Trouble (2011)
 Devilish Charm (2018)
 Diary of a Night Watchman (2014)
 Diary of a Prosecutor (2019–20)
 Did We Really Love? (1999)
 Different Dreams (2019)
 Dinner Mate (2020)
 Discovery of Love (2014)
 Distorted (2017)
 Divorce Attorney Shin (2023)
 Divorce Lawyer in Love (2015)
 Do Do Sol Sol La La Sol (2020)
 Do You Like Brahms? (2020)
 Doctor Detective (2019)
 Doctor Doctor (2000)
 Doctor John (2019)
 Doctor Lawyer (2022)
 Doctor Prisoner (2019)
 Doctor Stranger (2014)
 Dokgo Rewind (2018)
 Dong Yi (2010)
 Don't Cry My Love (2008–09)
 Don't Dare to Dream (2016)
 Don't Hesitate (2009–10)
 Don't Look Back: The Legend of Orpheus (2013)
 Doom at Your Service (2021)
 Doona! (2023)
 Drama City (1984–2008)
 Drama City: What Should I Do? (2004)
 Drama Special Series (2010–13)
 Just an Ordinary Love Story (2012)
 Puberty Medley (2013)
 Rock, Rock, Rock (2010)
 White Christmas (2011)
 Drama Stage (2017–present)
 Don't Announce Your Husband's Death (2022)
 Find the 1st Prize (2022)
 The Apartment Is Beautiful (2022)
 Dream (2009)
 Dream High (2011)
 Dream High 2 (2012)
 Dream of the Emperor (2012–13)
 Drinking Solo (2016)
 Dr. Brain (2021)
 Dr. Champ (2010)
 Dr. Frost (2014–15)
 Dr. Ian (2015)
 Dr. Jin (2012)
 Dr. Kkang (2006)
 Dr. Park's Clinic (2022)
 Dr. Romantic (2016–20)
 Duel (2017)
 Dummy Mommy (2012)

E

 East of Eden (2008–09)
 Eccentric! Chef Moon (2020)
 Eight Days, Assassination Attempts against King Jeongjo (2007)
 Eighteen, Twenty-Nine (2005)
 Emergency Couple (2014)
 Emperor of the Sea (2004–05)
 Empire of Gold (2013)
 Empress Cheonchu (2009)
 Empress Ki (2013–14)
 Empress Myeongseong (2001–02)
 Enchanting Neighbor (2015)
 Encounter (2018–19)
 Endless Love (2014)
 Endless Love Series (2000–06)
 Autumn in My Heart (2000)
 Spring Waltz (2006)
 Summer Scent (2003)
 Winter Sonata (2002)
 Enemies from the Past (2017–18)
 Entertainer (2016)
 Entourage (2016)
 Erexion (2006)
 Eve (2022)
 Evergreen (2018)
 Everybody Say Kimchi (2014)
 Exit (2018)
 Exo Next Door (2015)
 Extracurricular (2020)
 Extraordinary Attorney Woo (2022)
 Extraordinary You (2019)
 Ex-Girlfriends' Club (2015)
 Eyes of Dawn (1991–92)

F

 Faith (2012)
 Falling for Challenge (2015)
 Familiar Wife (2018)
 Family (2012–13)
 Family Secret (2014–15)
 Family's Honor (2008–09)
 Fanletter Please (2022)
 Fantastic (2016)
 Fashion 70s (2005)
 Fashion King (2012)
 Fatal Promise (2020)
 Fates & Furies (2018–19)
 Father, I'll Take Care of You (2016–17)
 Father's House (2009)
 Feast of the Gods (2012)
 Feel Good to Die (2018)
 Fight for My Way (2017)
 Find Me in Your Memory (2020)
 Fireworks (2000)
 Fireworks (2006)
 First Lady (2023)
 First Love (1996–97)
 First Love Again (2016–17)
 First Love of a Royal Prince (2004)
 First Wives' Club (2007–08)
 Five Enough (2016)
 Five Fingers (2012)
 Flames of Desire (2010–11)
 Flower Band (2012)
 Flower Crew: Joseon Marriage Agency (2019)
 Flower Grandpa Investigation Unit (2014)
 Flower of Evil (2020)
 Flower of Queen (2015)
 Flower of Revenge (2013)
 Flower Scholars' Love Story (2023)
 Flowers of the Prison (2016)
 Fly High Butterfly (2022)
 Forbidden Love (2004)
 Forecasting Love and Weather (2022)
 Forest (2020)
 Forever Young (2015)
 Foundation of the Kingdom (1983)
 Four Sisters (2001)
 Freedom Fighter, Lee Hoe-young (2010)
 Freeze (2006)
 Friend, Our Legend (2009)
 Friends (2002)
 From Now On, Showtime! (2022)
 Full House (2004)
 Full House Take 2 (2012)

G

 Gangnam Beauty (2018)
 Gangnam Scandal (2018–19)
 Gap-dong (2014)
 Gaus Electronics (2022)
 Get Karl! Oh Soo-jung (2007)
 Get Revenge (2020–21)
 Get Up (2008)
 Ghost Doctor (2022)
 Giant (2010)
 Girls' Generation 1979 (2017)
 Glamorous Temptation (2015–16)
 Glass Castle (2008–09)
 Glass Mask (2012–13)
 Glass Slippers (2002)
 Glitch (2022)
 Gloria (2010–11)
 Glorious Day (2014)
 Glory Jane (2011)
 Go Back (2017)
 God of War (2012)
 Goddess of Fire (2013)
 Goddess of Marriage (2013)
 God's Gift: 14 Days (2014)
 Gogh, The Starry Night (2016)
 Gold Mask (2022)
 Golden Apple (2005–06)
 Golden Bride (2007–08)
 Golden Cross (2014)
 Golden Fish (2010)
 Golden House (2010)
 Golden Pouch (2016–17)
 Golden Rainbow (2013–14)
 Golden Time (2012)
 Good Casting (2020)
 Good Doctor (2013)
 Good Job (2022)
 Good Job, Good Job (2009)
 Good Manager (2017)
 Goodbye Dear Wife (2012)
 Goodbye Earth (TBA)
 Goodbye Mr. Black (2016)
 Goodbye My Love (1999)
 Goodbye Solo (2006)
 Goodbye to Goodbye (2018)
 Gourmet (2008)
 Graceful Family (2019)
 Graceful Friends (2020)
 Gracious Revenge (2019–20)
 Grand Prince (2018)
 Great Inheritance (2006)
 Green Mothers' Club (2022)
 Green Rose (2005)
 Grid (2022)
 Grudge: The Revolt of Gumiho (2010)
 Gu Family Book (2013)
 Guardian Angel (2001)
 Guardian: The Lonely and Great God (2016–17)
 Gunman in Joseon (2014)
 Gwanggaeto, The Great Conqueror (2011–12)
 Gyebaek (2011)
 Gyeongseong Creature (2023)

H

 H.I.T (2007)
 Haechi (2019)
 Happiness (2021)
 Happiness in the Wind (2010)
 Happy Ending (2012)
 Happy Home (2016)
 Happy Sisters (2017–18)
 Happy Together (1999)
 He Is Psychometric (2019)
 He Who Can't Marry (2009)
 Heading to the Ground (2009)
 Healer (2014–15)
 Heard It Through the Grapevine (2015)
 Heart Surgeons (2018)
 Heart to Heart (2015)
 Heartless City (2013)
 Hearts of Nineteen (2006–07)
 Heartstrings (2011)
 Heaven & Earth (2007)
 Hell Is Other People (2019)
 Hellbound (2021)
 Hello Franceska (2005–06)
 Hello Monster (2015)
 Hello My Teacher (2005)
 Hello, Me! (2021)
 Hello! Miss (2007)
 Hello, My Twenties! (2016–17)
 Her Private Life (2019)
 Here Comes Mr. Oh (2012–13)
 Here's My Plan (2021)
 Hero (2009–10)
 Hi Bye, Mama! (2020)
 Hi! School: Love On (2014)
 Hidden Identity (2015)
 Hide and Seek (2018)
 High Class (2021)
 High End Crush (2015–16)
 High Kick Through the Roof (2009–10)
 High Kick! (2006–07)
 High Kick: Revenge of the Short Legged (2011–12)
 High School King of Savvy (2014)
 High Society (2015)
 History of a Salaryman (2012)
 Hit the Top (2017)
 Hogu's Love (2015)
 Hold Me Tight (2018)
 Hold My Hand (2013–14)
 Home for Summer (2019)
 Home Sweet Home (2010)
 Homemade Love Story (2020–21)
 Hometown (2021)
 Hometown Cha-Cha-Cha (2021)
 Hong Gil-dong (2008)
 Hong Kong Express (2005)
 Hospital Playlist (2020–21)
 Hospital Ship (2017)
 Hot Blood (2009)
 Hot Stove League (2019–20)
 Hotel del Luna (2019)
 Hotel King (2014)
 Hotelier (2001)
 House of Bluebird (2015)
 How Are U Bread (2020)
 How Long I've Kissed (2012)
 How to Be Thirty (2021)
 How to Buy a Friend (2020)
 How to Meet a Perfect Neighbor (2007)
 How Should I Be (2002)
 Hur Jun (1999–2000)
 Hur Jun, The Original Story (2013)
 Hush (2020–21)
 Hwang Jini (2006)
 Hwarang: The Poet Warrior Youth (2016–17)
 Hyde Jekyll, Me (2015)
 Hyena (2020)
 Hymn of Death (2018)

I

 I Am Legend (2010)
 I Am Sam (2007)
 I Am the Mother Too (2018)
 I Can Hear Your Voice (2013)
 I Do, I Do (2012)
 I Have a Lover (2015–16)
 I Love Lee Taly (2012–13)
 I Need Romance (2011)
 I Need Romance 2012 (2012)
 I Need Romance 3 (2014)
 I Order You (2015)
 I Picked Up a Celebrity on the Street (2018)
 I Wanna Hear Your Song (2019)
 I'm After You (2015)
 I'm Not a Robot (2017–18)
 I'm Sorry, But I Love You (2016–17)
 I'm Sorry, I Love You (2004)
 Ice Adonis (2012)
 Ice Girl (2005)
 Idol Drama Operation Team (2017)
 Idol: The Coup (2021)
 If Tomorrow Comes (2011–12)
 If You Wish Upon Me (2022)
 Iljimae (1993)
 Iljimae (2008)
 Imaginary Cat (2015–16)
 Imitation (2021)
 Immortal Admiral Yi Sun-sin (2004–05)
 In-soon Is Pretty (2007)
 Incarnation of Money (2013)
 Innocent Defendant (2017)
 Insider (2022)
 Inspector Koo (2021)
 Inspiring Generation (2014)
 Insu, the Queen Mother (2011–12)
 Into the Flames (2014)
 Introverted Boss (2017)
 Invincible Lee Pyung Kang (2009)
 Ireland (2004)
 Iris (2009)
 Iris II: New Generation (2013)
 Is It Fate? (2023)
 Island (2022)
 Itaewon Class (2020)
 Item (2019)
 It's Beautiful Now (2022)
 It's My Life (2018–19)
 It's Okay to Not Be Okay (2020)
 It's Okay, Daddy's Girl (2010–11)
 It's Okay, That's Love (2014)

J

 Ja Myung Go (2009)
 Jang Bo-ri Is Here! (2014)
 Jang Ok-jung, Living by Love (2013)
 Jang Yeong-sil (2016)
 Jejungwon (2010)
 Jeon Woo-chi (2012–13)
 Jeong Do-jeon (2014)
 Ji Woon-soo's Stroke of Luck (2012)
 Jikji (2005)
 Jinxed at First (2022)
 Jirisan (2021)
 Jolly Widows (2009–10)
 Joseon Exorcist (2021)
 Joseon Lawyer (2023)
 Joseon Survival Period (2019)
 Joseon X-Files (2010)
 JTBC Drama Festa (2017–present)
 Hello Dracula (2020)
 Judge vs. Judge (2017–18)
 Jugglers (2017–18)
 Jumong (2006–07)
 Jump (1999)
 Jungle Fish (2008)
 Jungle Fish 2 (2010)
 Junwoo (1975–78)
 Just Dance (2018)
 Justice (2019)
 Juvenile Justice (2022)

K

 Kairos (2020)
 KBS Drama Special (2010–present)
 Cutting Off the Heart (2010)
 Do You Know Taekwondo? (2012)
 I'm Dying Soon (2014)
 If We Were a Season (2017)
 My Prettiest Moments (2012)
 Pianist (2010)
 Pinocchio's Nose (2016)
 Reason (2010)
 Review Notebook of My Embarrassing Days (2018)
 The Memory in My Old Wallet (2013)
 KBS TV Novel (1987–2018)
 A Sea of Her Own (2017)
 Dal Soon's Spring (2017–18)
 Dear My Sister (2011–12)
 Eunhui (2013–14)
 In Still Green Days (2015)
 Land of Gold (2014)
 Love, My Love (2012–13)
 My Mind's Flower Rain (2016)
 Samsaengi (2013)
 Single-minded Dandelion (2014–15)
 Sunok (2006)
 That Sun in the Sky (2016–17)
 The Stars Are Shining (2015–16)
 Through the Waves (2018)
 Kill Heel (2022)
 Kill It (2019)
 Kill Me, Heal Me (2015)
 Kim Is a Genius (2019)
 Kim Su-ro, The Iron King (2010)
 Kimcheed Radish Cubes (2007–08)
 Kimchi Cheese Smile (2007–08)
 Kimchi Family (2011–12)
 King of Ambition (2013)
 King the Land (2023)
 Kingdom (2019–present)
 Kingmaker: The Change of Destiny (2020)
 Kiss Sixth Sense (2022)
 Kkondae Intern (2020)
 Kokdu: Season of Deity (2023)
 Korean Peninsula (2012)

L

 L.U.C.A.: The Beginning (2021)
 Lady Cha Dal-rae's Lover (2018–19)
 Land of Wine (2003)
 Last (2015)
 Last Scandal (2008)
 Late Night Restaurant (2015)
 Law School (2021)
 Lawless Lawyer (2018)
 Lawyers (2005)
 Lee San, Wind of the Palace (2007–08)
 Left-Handed Wife (2019)
 Legal High (2019)
 Legend of Hyang Dan (2007)
 Legend of the Patriots (2010)
 Less Than Evil (2018–19)
 Let Me Be Your Knight (2021)
 Let Me Introduce Her (2018)
 Let's Eat (2013–14)
 Let's Eat 2 (2015)
 Let's Eat 3 (2018)
 Level Up (2019)
 Leverage (2019)
 Liar Game (2014)
 Lie After Lie (2020)
 Lie to Me (2011)
 Life (2018)
 Life Is Beautiful (2010)
 Life on Mars (2018)
 Lights and Shadows (2011–12)
 Light on Me (2021)
 Likeable or Not (2007–08)
 Line Romance (2014)
 Link: Eat, Love, Kill (2022)
 Listen to Love (2016)
 Listen to My Heart (2011)
 Little Women (2022)
 Live (2018)
 Live On (2020–21)
 Live Up to Your Name (2017)
 Liver or Die (2019)
 Living Among the Rich (2011–12)
 Living in Style (2011–12)
 Lobbyist (2007)
 Local Hero (2016)
 Look Back in Anger (2000)
 Loss Time Life (2019)
 Lost (2021)
 Love & Secret (2014–15)
 Love (ft. Marriage and Divorce) (2021–22)
 Love Again (2012)
 Love Alarm (2019–21)
 Love Alert (2018)
 Love All Play (2022)
 Love and Obsession (2009–10)
 Love Can't Wait (2006)
 Love for a Thousand More (2016)
 Love in 3 Colors (1999)
 Love in Contract (2022)
 Love in Her Bag (2013)
 Love in Sadness (2019)
 Love in the Moonlight (2016)
 Love Is for Suckers (2022)
 Love Letter (2003)
 Love Me When You Can (2006–07)
 Love on a Rooftop (2015)
 Love Playlist (2017–19)
 Love Rain (2012)
 Love Returns (2017–18)
 Love Revolution (2020)
 Love Scene Number (2021)
 Love Story in Harvard (2004–05)
 Love to Hate You (2023)
 Love to the End (2018)
 Love Truly (2006)
 Love Twist (2021–22)
 Love with Flaws (2019–20)
 Loveholic (2005)
 Lovely Horribly (2018)
 Lovers (2006–07)
 Lovers in Bloom (2017)
 Lovers in Paris (2004)
 Lovers in Prague (2005)
 Lovers of Haeundae (2012)
 Lovers of Music (2014)
 Lovers of the Red Sky (2021)
 Lovestruck in the City (2020–21)
 Loving You a Thousand Times (2009–10)
 Lucky Romance (2016)

M

 Ma Boy (2012)
 Mackerel Run (2007)
 Mad Dog (2017)
 Mad for Each Other (2021)
 Madame Antoine: The Love Therapist (2016)
 Magic Cellphone (2016)
 Magic Kid Masuri (2002–04)
 Make a Woman Cry (2015)
 Make Your Wish (2014–15)
 Mama (2014)
 Man from the Equator (2012)
 Man in a Veil (2020–21)
 Man in the Kitchen (2017–18)
 Man to Man (2017)
 Man Who Dies to Live (2017)
 Manhole (2017)
 Manny (2011)
 Marriage Contract (2016)
 Marriage, Not Dating (2014)
 Marry Him If You Dare (2013)
 Marry Me Now (2018)
 Marry Me, Mary! (2010)
 Marrying a Millionaire (2005–06)
 Marrying My Daughter Twice (2016)
 Mask (2015)
 Mask Girl (2023)
 Master of Study (2010)
 Master's Sun (2013)
 Matrimonial Chaos (2018)
 May I Help You? (2022)
 May It Please the Court (2022)
 May Queen (2012)
 Me Too, Flower! (2011)
 Medical Top Team (2013)
 Melancholia (2021)
 Melody of Love (2013–14)
 Meloholic (2017)
 Melting Me Softly (2019)
 Memories of the Alhambra (2018–19)
 Memorials (2020)
 Memorist (2020)
 Memory (2016)
 Men Are Men (2020)
 Mental Coach Jegal (2022)
 Merry Mary (2007)
 Midas (2011)
 Military Prosecutor Doberman (2022)
 Mimi (2014)
 Mina (2001)
 Mine (2021)
 Misaeng: Incomplete Life (2014)
 Miss Ajumma (2011)
 Miss Korea (2013–14)
 Miss Lee (2019)
 Miss Mamma Mia (2015)
 Miss Mermaid (2002–03)
 Miss Monte-Cristo (2021)
 Miss Panda and Mr. Hedgehog (2012)
 Miss Ripley (2011)
 Missing 9 (2017)
 Missing You (2012–13)
 Missing: The Other Side (2020)
 Mistress (2018)
 Misty (2018)
 Model (1997)
 Modern Farmer (2014)
 Mom and Sister (2000–01)
 Mom Has an Affair (2020)
 Mom's Dead Upset (2008)
 Money Flower (2017–18)
 Money Game (2020)
 Money Heist: Korea – Joint Economic Area (2022)
 Monstar (2013)
 Monster (2016)
 Monstrous (2022)
 Monthly Magazine Home (2021)
 Moon Embracing the Sun (2012)
 Moon Lovers: Scarlet Heart Ryeo (2016)
 Moonshine (2021–22)
 Moorim School: Saga of the Brave (2016)
 More Than a Maid (2015)
 More Than Friends (2020)
 Mother (2018)
 Mother of Mine (2019)
 Mother's Garden (2014)
 Mouse (2021)
 Move to Heaven (2021)
 Moving (2023)
 Mr. Back (2014)
 Mr. Duke (2000)
 Mr. Queen (2020–21)
 Mr. Sunshine (2018)
 Mrs. Cop (2015)
 Mrs. Cop 2 (2016)
 Ms. Hammurabi (2018)
 Ms. Kim's Million Dollar Quest (2004)
 Ms. Ma, Nemesis (2018)
 Ms. Perfect (2017)
 Murder DIEary (2023)
 My 19 Year Old Sister-in-Law (2004)
 My Absolute Boyfriend (2019)
 My Beautiful Bride (2015)
 My Beloved Sister (2006–07)
 My Bittersweet Life (2011)
 My Catman (2017)
 My Contracted Husband, Mr. Oh (2018)
 My Country: The New Age (2019)
 My Cute Guys (2013)
 My Dangerous Wife (2020)
 My Daughter the Flower (2011–12)
 My Daughter, Geum Sa-wol (2015–16)
 My Dear Cat (2014)
 My Fair Lady (2003)
 My Fair Lady (2009)
 My Fair Lady (2016–17)
 My Fantastic Funeral (2015)
 My Father Is Strange (2017)
 My Fellow Citizens! (2019)
 My First First Love (2019)
 My First Love (2018)
 My First Time (2015)
My Girl (2005–06)
My Girlfriend Is a Gumiho (2010)
 My Golden Life (2017–18)
 My Healing Love (2018–19)
 My Heart Twinkle Twinkle (2015)
 My Holo Love (2020)
 My Horrible Boss (2016)
 My Husband Got a Family (2012)
 My Husband's Woman (2007)
 My Kids Give Me a Headache (2012–13)
 My Lawyer, Mr. Jo (2016)
 My Lawyer, Mr. Jo 2: Crime and Punishment (2019)
 My Liberation Notes (2022)
 My Little Baby (2016)
 My Love By My Side (2011)
 My Love from the Star (2013–14)
 My Love Patzzi (2002)
 My Love Toram (2005)
 My Lovely Girl (2014)
 My Lovely Sam Soon (2005)
 My Lover, Madame Butterfly (2012–13)
 My Mister (2018)
 My Mother Is a Daughter-in-law (2015)
 My Name (2021)
 My Only Love Song (2017)
 My Only One (2018–19)
 My Precious You (2008–09)
 My Princess (2011)
 My Roommate Is a Gumiho (2021)
 My Rosy Life (2005)
 My Runway (2016)
 My Sassy Girl (2017)
 My Secret Hotel (2014)
 My Secret Romance (2017)
 My Secret Terrius (2018)
 My Spring Days (2014)
 My Strange Hero (2018–19)
 My Too Perfect Sons (2009)
 My Unfamiliar Family (2020)
 My Unfortunate Boyfriend (2015)
 Mysterious Personal Shopper (2018)
 Mystery 6 (2006)
 Mystic Pop-up Bar (2020)

N

 Naeil's Cantabile (2014)
 Naked Fireman (2017)
 Narco-Saints (2022)
 Navillera (2021)
 Never Twice (2019–20)
 Nevertheless (2021)
 New Heart (2007–08)
 New Tales of Gisaeng (2011)
 Nice Witch (2018)
 Night Light (2016–17)
 Nine (2013)
 No Matter What (2020–21)
 No, Thank You (2020–21)
 Noble, My Love (2015)
 Nobody Knows (2020)
 Nokdu Flower (2019)
 Nonstop (2000–06)
 Now, We Are Breaking Up (2021)

O

 Oasis (2023)
 OB & GY (2010)
 Oh Feel Young (2014)
 Oh My Baby (2020)
 Oh My Ghost (2015)
 Oh My Ladylord (2021)
 Oh My Venus (2015–16)
 Oh! My Lady (2010)
 Oh, the Mysterious (2017–18)
 Ohlala Couple (2012)
 Ojakgyo Family (2011–12)
 On Air (2008)
 On the Verge of Insanity (2021)
 On the Way to the Airport (2016)
 Once Again (2020)
 One Dollar Lawyer (2022)
 One Fine Day (2006)
 One Mom and Three Dads (2008)
 One More Happy Ending (2016)
 One More Time (2017)
 One Ordinary Day (2021)
 One Spring Night (2019)
 One Sunny Day (2014–15)
 One the Woman (2021)
 One Warm Word (2013–14)
 One Well-Raised Daughter (2013–14)
 Only Because It's You (2012)
 Only Love (2014)
 Only You (2005)
 Operation Proposal (2012)
 Orange Marmalade (2015)
 Our Beloved Summer (2021)
 Our Blooming Youth (2023)
 Our Blues (2022)
 Our Gap-soon (2016–17)
 Over the Rainbow (2006)

P

 Pachinko (2022)
 Padam Padam (2011–12)
 Page Turner (2016)
 Painter of the Wind (2008)
 Pandora: Beneath the Paradise (2023)
 Papa (1996)
 Paradise Ranch (2011)
 Partners for Justice (2018–19)
 Passionate Love (2013–14)
 Pasta (2010)
 Payback (2023)
 Pegasus Market (2019)
 Perfume (2019)
 Persona (2019)
 Personal Taste (2010)
 Phantom (2012)
 Phoenix (2004)
 Phoenix 2020 (2020)
 Piano (2001–02)
 Pied Piper (2016)
 Pink Lipstick (2010)
 Pinocchio (2014–15)
 Player (2018)
 Playful Kiss (2010)
 Please Come Back, Soon-ae (2006)
 Please Don't Date Him (2020–21)
 Plus Nine Boys (2014)
 Police University (2021)
 Poong, the Joseon Psychiatrist (2022)
 Poseidon (2011)
 Possessed (2019)
 Potato Star 2013QR3 (2013–14)
 Pots of Gold (2013)
 Precious Family (2004–05)
 Pride and Prejudice (2014–15)
 Priest (2018–19)
 Prime Minister & I (2013–14)
 Prince Hours (2007)
 Princess Aurora (2013)
 Princess Hours (2006)
 Princess Lulu (2005)
 Prison Playbook (2017–18)
 Private Lives (2020)
 Prosecutor Princess (2010)
 Protect the Boss (2011)
 Psychopath Diary (2019–20)
 Punch (2014–15)
 Pure Love (2013)
 Pure Pumpkin Flower (2010–11)

Q

 Que Sera Sera (2007)
 Queen and I (2012)
 Queen for Seven Days (2017)
 Queen of Housewives (2009)
 Queen of Mystery (2017)
 Queen of Mystery 2 (2018)
 Queen of Reversals (2010–11)
 Queen Seondeok (2009)
 Queen: Love and War (2019–20)
 Quiz of God (2010–19)

R

 Racket Boys (2021)
 Radiant Office (2017)
 Radio Romance (2018)
 Rain or Shine (2017–18)
 Reborn Rich (2022)
 Record of Youth (2020)
 Red Shoes (2021)
 Reflection of You (2021)
 Remarriage & Desires (2022)
 Remember (2015–16)
 Replay: The Moment (2021)
 Reply Series (2012–16)
 Reply 1988 (2015–16)
 Reply 1994 (2013)
 Reply 1997 (2012)
 Reset (2014)
 Resurrection (2005)
 Return (2018)
 Reunited Worlds (2017)
 Revenge of Others (2022)
 Reverse (2017–18)
 Revolutionary Love (2017)
 Revolutionary Sisters (2021)
 Rich Man (2018)
 Righteous Love (2014–15)
 Risky Romance (2018)
 River Where the Moon Rises (2021)
 Road No. 1 (2010)
 Robber (2008)
 Romance (2002)
 Romance Is a Bonus Book (2019)
 Romance Town (2011)
 Romance Zero (2009)
 Romantic Guest House (2023)
 Rooftop Prince (2012)
 Rookie Historian Goo Hae-ryung (2019)
 Rookie Cops (2022)
 Room No. 9 (2018)
 Rose Mansion (2022)
 Rosy Lovers (2014–15)
 Royal Secret Agent (2020–21)
 Royal Family (2011)
 Ruby Ring (2013–14)
 Ruby Ruby Love (2017)
 Rugal (2020)
 Ruler of Your Own World (2002)
 Run (2020)
 Run Into You (2023)
 Run On (2020–21)
 Run, Jang-mi (2014–15)
 Rustic Period (2002–03)

S

 Sad Love Story (2005)
 Saimdang, Memoir of Colors (2017)
 Salamander Guru and The Shadows (2012)
 Salut D'Amour (1994–95)
 Sandglass (1995)
 Sang Doo! Let's Go to School (2003)
 Sassy Girl Chun-hyang (2005)
 Save Me (2017)
 Save Me 2 (2019)
 Save the Family (2015)
 Save the Last Dance for Me (2004–05)
 Say It with Your Eyes (2000–01)
 Scent of a Woman (2011)
 School Series (1999–present)
 School 2013 (2012–13)
 School 2017 (2017)
 School 2021 (2021)
 Who Are You: School 2015 (2015)
 Schoolgirl Detectives (2014–15)
 Search (2020)
 Search: WWW (2019)
 Second 20s (2015)
 Second to Last Love (2016)
 Secret (2000)
 Secret Affair (2014)
 Secret Boutique (2019)
 Secret Door (2014)
 Secret Garden (2010–11)
 Secret Healer (2016)
 Secret Love (2013)
 Secret Mother (2018)
 Secret Queen Makers (2018)
 Secret Royal Inspector & Joy (2021)
 Secrets and Lies (2018–19)
 Secrets of Women (2016)
 See You in My 19th Life (2023)
 Sell Your Haunted House (2021)
 Semantic Error (2022)
 Seoul 1945 (2006)
 Seoyoung, My Daughter (2012–13)
 Sexi Mong (2007)
 SF8 (2020)
 Sharp (2003–07)
 She Knows Everything (2020)
 She Was Pretty (2015)
 She Would Never Know (2021)
 Shine or Go Crazy (2015)
 Shining Romance (2013–14)
 Shopping King Louie (2016)
 Short (2018)
 Should We Kiss First? (2018)
 Show Window: The Queen's House (2021)
 Sh**ting Stars (2022)
 Sign (2011)
 Signal (2016)
 Sin Don (2005–06)
 Single Dad in Love (2008)
 Sisters of the Sea (2005–06)
 Sisters-in-Law (2017)
 Sisyphus: The Myth (2021)
 Six Flying Dragons (2015–16)
 Sketch (2018)
 Sky Castle (2018–19)
 Smile Again (2006)
 Smile Again (2010–11)
 Smile, Mom (2010–11)
 Smile, You (2009–10)
 Snow Flower (2006–07)
 Snowdrop (2021)
 So I Married the Anti-fan (2021)
 So Not Worth It (2021)
 Solomon's Perjury (2016–17)
 Somebody (2022)
 Someday (2006)
 Something About 1% (2003)
 Something About 1 Percent (2016)
 Something Happened in Bali (2004)
 Something in the Rain (2018)
 Song of the Bandits (2023)
 Songgot: The Piercer (2015)
 Soul (2009)
 Soul Mechanic (2020)
 Soundtrack 1 (2022)
 Special Affairs Team TEN (2011–13)
 Special Labor Inspector (2019)
 Splash Splash Love (2015)
 Splendid Politics (2015)
 Sponsor (2022)
 Spotlight (2008)
 Spring Day (2005)
 Spring Turns to Spring (2019)
 Spy (2015)
 Spy Myung-wol (2011)
 Squad 38 (2016)
 Squid Game (2021)
 Stained Glass (2004–05)
 Stairway to Heaven (2003–04)
 Standby (2012)
 Star in My Heart (1997)
 Stars Falling from the Sky (2010)
 Start-Up (2020)
 Star's Echo (2004)
 Star's Lover (2008–09)
 Steal Heart (2014)
 Stealer: The Treasure Keeper (2023)
 Still 17 (2018)
 Still You (2012)
 Stranger (2017–present)
 Strangers 6 (2012)
 Strong Girl Bong-soon (2017)
 Strong Woman Gang Nam-soon (2023)
 Strongest Chil Woo (2008)
 Strongest Deliveryman (2017)
 Style (2009)
 Successful Story of a Bright Girl (2002)
 Suits (2018)
 Summer Strike (2022)
 Sungkyunkwan Scandal (2010)
 Sunlight Pours Down (2004)
 Sunny Again Tomorrow (2018)
 Super Daddy Yeol (2015)
 Super Junior Unbelievable Story (2008)
 Super Rookie (2005)
 Surgeon Bong Dal-hee (2007)
 Suspicious Partner (2017)
 Swallow the Sun (2009)
 Sweden Laundry (2014–15)
 Sweet 18 (2004)
 Sweet Buns (2004–05)
 Sweet Enemy (2017)
 Sweet Home (2020)
 Sweet Home, Sweet Honey (2015–16)
 Sweet Munchies (2020)
 Sweet Revenge (2017–18)
 Sweet Revenge 2 (2018)
 Sweet Spy (2005–06)
 Sweet Stranger and Me (2016)
 Sweet, Savage Family (2015–16)
 Switch (2018)
 Syndrome (2012)

T

 Taejo Wang Geon (2000–02)
 Take Care of Us, Captain (2012)
 Tale of Fairy (2018)
 Tale of the Nine Tailed (2020)
 Tamra, the Island (2009)
 Tasty Life (2012)
 Taxi Driver (2021)
 Tazza (2008)
 Team Bulldog: Off-Duty Investigation (2020)
 Tears of Heaven (2014–15)
 Tears of the Dragon (1996–98)
 Tell Me What You Saw (2020)
 Temperature of Love (2017)
 Temptation (2014)
 Temptation of an Angel (2009)
 Temptation of Wife (2008–09)
 Tempted (2018)
 Terroir (2008–09)
 Thank You (2007)
 That Winter, the Wind Blows (2013)
 The 101st Proposal (2006)
 The Accidental Couple (2009)
 The All-Round Wife (2021)
 The Banker (2019)
 The Beauty Inside (2018)
 The Birth of a Family (2012–13)
 The Blade and Petal (2013)
 The Bride of Habaek (2017)
 The Chaser (2012)
 The City Hall (2009)
 The Clinic for Married Couples: Love and War (1999–2009)
 The Cursed (2020)
 The Crowned Clown (2019)
 The Dawn of the Empire (2002–03)
 The Devil (2007
 The Devil (2023)
 The Devil Judge (2021)
 The Doctors (2016)
 The Duo (2011)
 The Eldest (2013–14)
 The Emperor: Owner of the Mask (2017)
 The Empire (2022)
 The End of the World (2013)
 The Escape of the Seven (2023)
 The Fabulous (2022)
 The Family is Coming (2015)
 The Fiery Priest (2019)
 The First Responders (2022)
 The Forbidden Marriage (2022)
 The Fugitive of Joseon (2013)
 The Fugitive: Plan B (2010)
 The Game: Towards Zero (2020)
 The Gentlemen of Wolgyesu Tailor Shop (2016–17)
 The Ghost Detective (2018)
 The Glory (2022)
 The Golden Garden (2019)
 The Golden Spoon (2022)
 The Good Bad Mother (2023)
 The Good Detective (2020)
 The Good Wife (2016)
 The Great King, Sejong (2008)
 The Great Merchant (2010)
 The Great Seer (2012–13)
 The Great Shaman Ga Doo-shim (2021)
 The Great Show (2019)
 The Greatest Love (2011)
 The Greatest Marriage (2014)
 The Guardians (2017)
 The Guest (2018)
 The Happy Loner (2017)
 The Heirs (2013)
 The Heavenly Idol (2023)
 The Hymn of Death (2018)
 The Idle Mermaid (2014)
 The Idolmaster KR (2017)
 The Innocent Man (2012)
 The Jingbirok: A Memoir of Imjin War (2015)
 The K2 (2016)
 The Killer's Shopping List (2022)
 The King 2 Hearts (2012)
 The King and I (2007–08)
 The King and the Queen (1998–2000)
 The King in Love (2017)
 The King of Chudong Palace (1983)
 The King of Dramas (2012–13)
 The King of Legend (2010–11)
 The King of Pigs (2022)
 The King of Tears, Lee Bang-won (2021–22)
 The King: Eternal Monarch (2020)
 The King's Affection (2021)
 The King's Daughter, Soo Baek-hyang (2013–14)
 The King's Doctor (2012–13)
 The King's Face (2014–15)
 The Kingdom of the Winds (2008–09)
 The Lady in Dignity (2017)
 The Last Empress (2018–19)
 The Last Match (1994)
 The Law Cafe (2022)
 The Legend (2007)
 The Legend of the Blue Sea (2016–17)
 The Liar and His Lover (2017)
 The Lies Within (2019)
 The Light in Your Eyes (2019)
 The Love Is Coming (2016)
 The Lover (2015)
 The Man in the Mask (2015)
 The Master of Revenge (2016)
 The Merchant (2001–02)
 The Merchant: Gaekju 2015 (2015–16)
 The Miracle (2013)
 The Miracle We Met (2018)
 The Missing (2015)
 The Most Beautiful Goodbye (2017)
 The Musical (2011)
 The Mysterious Class (2021)
 The Noblesse (2014)
 The One and Only (2021–22)
 The Package (2017)
 The Penthouse: War in Life (2020–21)
 The President (2010–11)
 The Princess' Man (2011)
 The Producers (2015)
 The Promise (2016)
 The Queen of Office (2013)
 The Queen's Classroom (2013)
 The Real Has Come! (2023)
 The Rebel (2017)
 The Red Sleeve (2021)
 The Reputable Family (2010)
 The Return of Hwang Geum-bok (2015)
 The Return of Iljimae (2009)
 The Rich Son (2018)
 The Road Home (2009)
 The Road: The Tragedy of One (2021)
 The Royal Gambler (2016)
 The Running Mates: Human Rights (2019)
 The Scandal (2013)
 The Scholar Who Walks the Night (2015)
 The School Nurse Files (2020)
 The Second Husband (2021–22)
 The Secret House (2022)
 The Secret Life of My Secretary (2019)
 The Secret Lovers (2005)
 The Secret of Birth (2013)
 The Secret of My Love (2017–18)
 The Silent Sea (2021)
 The Slave Hunters (2010)
 The Slingshot (2009)
 The Smile Has Left Your Eyes (2018)
 The Snow Queen (2006–07)
 The Sound of Magic (2021)
 The Sound of Your Heart (2016)
 The Spies Who Loved Me (2020)
 The Story of Kang-goo (2014)
 The Suspicious Housekeeper (2013)
 The Tale of Nokdu (2019)
 The Third Charm (2018)
 The Third Hospital (2012)
 The Thorn Birds (2011)
 The Three Musketeers (2014)
 The Three Witches (2015–16)
 The Time (2018)
 The Time We Were Not in Love (2015)
 The Uncanny Counter (2020–21)
 The Undateables (2018)
 The Vampire Detective (2016)
 The Veil (2021)
 The Village: Achiara's Secret (2015)
 The Vineyard Man (2006)
 The Virtual Bride (2015)
 The Virus (2013)
 The Wedding Scheme (2012)
 The Wind Blows (2019)
 The Witch's Diner (2021)
 The Woman Who Still Wants to Marry (2010)
 The World of the Married (2020)
 The Worst of Evil (2023)
 The Youngest Son of a Conglomerate (2022)
 Thirty-Nine (2022)
 This Is My Love (2015)
 Thousand Years of Love (2003)
 Three Bold Siblings (2022)
 Three Brothers (2009–10)
 Three Color Fantasy (2017)
 Queen of the Ring (2017)
 Romance Full of Life (2017)
 The Universe's Star (2017)
 Three Days (2014)
 Three Friends (2000–01)
 Three Sisters (2010)
 Thrice Married Woman (2013–14)
 Through the Darkness (2021)
 Time Between Dog and Wolf (2007)
 Times (2021)
 To My Beloved (2012)
 To the Beautiful You (2012)
 To. Jenny (2018)
 Today's Webtoon (2022)
 Toji, the Land (2004–05)
 Tokyo Sun Shower (2008)
 Tomorrow (2022)
 Tomorrow Boy (2016)
 Tomorrow, with You (2017)
 Top Management (2018)
 Top Star U-back (2018–19)
 Touch (2020)
 Touch Your Heart (2019)
 Tracer (2022)
 Train (2020)
 Trap (2019)
 Tree of Heaven (2006)
 Triangle (2014)
 Trio (2002–03)
 Triple (2009)
 Trolley (2022)
 True Beauty (2020–21)
 Tunnel (2017)
 Twelve Nights (2018)
 Twenty-Five Twenty-One (2022)
 Twinkle Twinkle (2011)
 Two Cops (2017–18)
 Two Mothers (2014)
 Two Outs in the Ninth Inning (2007)
 Two Weeks (2013)
 Two Wives (2009)
 Two Women's Room (2013–14)

U

 Ugly Alert (2013)
 Ugly Miss Young-ae (2007–2019)
 Unasked Family (2019–2020)
 Uncle (2021)
 Uncontrollably Fond (2016)
 Under the Queen's Umbrella (2022)
 Undercover (2021)
 Understanding of Love (2022)
 Unframed (2021)
 Unkind Ladies (2015)
 Unknown Woman (2017)
 Unlock the Boss (2022)
 Unstoppable Marriage (2007–08)
 Until the Azalea Blooms (1998)
 Untouchable (2017–18)
 Useless Lies (2023)

V

 Vagabond (2019)
 Vampire Idol (2011–12)
 Vampire Prosecutor (2011–12)
 Vengeance of the Bride (2022)
 Vincenzo (2021)
 VIP (2019)
 Voice (2017–present)

W

 W (2016)
 Wang's Family (2014)
 Want a Taste? (2019–20)
 Wanted (2016)
 War of Money (2007)
 Warm and Cozy (2015)
 Warrior Baek Dong-soo (2011)
 Was It Love? (2020)
 Watcher (2019)
 We Are Dating Now (2002)
 Weak Hero Class 1 (2022)
 We Broke Up (2015)
 Webtoon Hero Toondra Show (2015–16)
 Wedding (2005)
 Wednesday 3:30 PM (2017)
 Weightlifting Fairy Kim Bok-joo (2016–17)
 Welcome (2020)
 Welcome 2 Life (2019)
 Welcome Rain to My Life (2012)
 Welcome to the Show (2011)
 Welcome to Waikiki (2018)
 Welcome to Waikiki 2 (2019)
 Welcome to Wedding Hell (2022)
 West Palace (1995)
 What Happens to My Family? (2014–15)
 What's for Dinner? (2009)
 What's Up (2011–12)
 What's Up Fox (2006)
 What's Wrong with Secretary Kim (2018)
 When a Man Falls in Love (2013)
 When I Was the Most Beautiful (2020)
 When My Love Blooms (2020)
 When the Camellia Blooms (2019)
 When the Devil Calls Your Name (2019)
 When the Weather Is Fine (2020)
 When Women Powder Twice (2011–12)
 Where Stars Land (2018)
 Where Your Eyes Linger (2020)
 Which Star Are You From (2006)
 While You Were Sleeping (2011)
 While You Were Sleeping (2017)
 Whisper (2017)
 White Lie (2008–09)
 White Nights 3.98 (1998)
 Who Are You? (2008)
 Who Are You? (2013)
 Why Her (2022)
 Wife Returns (2009–10)
 Wild Romance (2012)
 Will It Snow for Christmas? (2009–10)
 Witch at Court (2017)
 Witch Yoo Hee (2007)
 Witch's Love (2018)
 Wok of Love (2018)
 Woman of 9.9 Billion (2019–20)
 Woman of Matchless Beauty, Park Jung-geum (2008)
 Woman with a Suitcase (2016)
 Women in the Sun (2008)
 Wonderful Days (2014)
 Wonderful Life (2005)
 Wonderful Mama (2013)
 Woori the Virgin (2022)
 Work Later, Drink Now (2021)
 Working Mom (2008)
 Working Mom Parenting Daddy (2016)
 Worlds Within (2008)
 Wuri's Family (2001–02)

X

 XX (2020)

Y

 Yeon Gaesomun (2006–07)
 Yeonnam-dong 539 (2018)
 YG Future Strategy Office (2018)
 Yonder (2022)
 Yong-pal (2015)
 You and I (1997–98)
 You Are a Gift (2016)
 You Are My Destiny (2008–09)
 You Are My Destiny (2014)
 You Are My Spring (2021)
 You Are the Best! (2013)
 You Are the Boss! (2013)
 You Are the Only One (2014–15)
 You Are Too Much (2017)
 You Don't Know Women (2017)
 You Drive Me Crazy (2018)
 You're All Surrounded (2014)
 You're Beautiful (2009)
 You're Only Mine (2014)
 Young Lady and Gentleman (2021–22)
 Your Honor (2018)
 Your House Helper (2018)
 Your Lady (2013)
 Your Neighbor's Wife (2013)
 Your Scene (2007)
 Youth (2021)
 Youth of May (2021)
 Yumi's Cells (2021–22)

Z

 Zombie Detective (2020)

See also
 List of South Korean television series
 Television in South Korea
 List of South Korean actresses
 List of South Korean male actors
 List of programs broadcast by Arirang TV
 List of programs broadcast by JTBC
 List of programs broadcast by Korean Broadcasting System
 List of programs broadcast by Munhwa Broadcasting Corporation
 List of programs broadcast by Seoul Broadcasting System

References